Fred Carl is a Montana politician. He served as a Republican member of the Montana Legislature from 1971 through 1974. In 2012, Fred Carl announced he would run for Montana Senate District 47, which represents a portion of the Missoula area.

Political history

1974 Senate term

2004 election
Fred Carl ran for election in 2004 against Jim Elliott, the incumbent Democrat. Carl lost the election to Elliott. Following the election, Elliott filed a complaint against Carl, alleging that cards distributed by his campaign misrepresented Elliott's voting record and violated Montana law. In 2006, the Commissioner of Political Practices agreed with this assertion and found Carl's campaign to be in violation.

2012 election
Fred Carl ran for election in 47th district of the Montana Senate in 2012. He was unopposed in the primary. He was running against Dick Barrett, the Democratic candidate, for an open seat. Carl lost the election to Barrett.

References

External links
Campaign website
 

Year of birth missing (living people)
Living people
Montana Republicans
Place of birth missing (living people)
Politicians from Missoula, Montana